Urn Burial is a 1987 young adult science fiction novel by Robert Westall. It involves alien races who resemble cats and dogs.

Setting

Westall has set Urn Burial in the Pennine chain of northern  England, near the Scottish border. The Cumbrian fell country is an isolated land of rain, prehistoric ruins, and heather. The sheep that run loose on the steep hills are still a major source of income, and shepherding is a respected profession. Life remains rather primitive on the fells, but the homes have electricity and running water and the shepherds reach their flocks on ATVs.

External links
Urn Burial at Fantastic Fiction

1987 British novels
1987 science fiction novels
British science fiction novels
Children's science fiction novels
British young adult novels
Novels set in Cumbria